The Blackcurrant Pie is a 1641 still life painting by the Dutch artist Willem Claesz. Heda. It is now in the Musée des Beaux-Arts of Strasbourg, France. Its inventory number is 1745.

The painting is representative of the mature Heda's style. The setting and the objects reappear with variants in several of Heda's paintings of that period (see below). The Blackcurrant Pie does not simply depict a still life with a great emphasis on texture and reflections, but also expresses the transience of all things (the lemon is peeled and cut in half, the rummer is half empty, the pie is partly eaten); it serves as an allegory.

Other versions

References

External links 
La Tourte au cassis , presentation on the museum's website

Paintings in the collection of the Musée des Beaux-Arts de Strasbourg
1641 paintings
Dutch Golden Age paintings
Oil paintings
Still life paintings
17th-century allegorical paintings